Jeremy Raponi Dodson (born August 30, 1987) is an American-Samoan sprinter. He competed in the 200 metres event at the 2011 and 2015 World Championships in Athletics in Daegu, South Korea and Beijing, China.

Background
Dodson was born and raised in the United States and is based in Colorado.  One of his parents is from Malie, Samoa; some have reported that his mother is Samoan, while others have reported that it is his father who is from Samoa.

High school
Dodson had 10.41 – 100 meters and 400-meters - 46.91 times in United States of America and was recruited to Arkansas Razorbacks and he was named to the USA Today All-USA high school track and field team in 2005. He won 2005 Colorado High School Activities Association state championships in the 100, 200 and 400 meters. He earned silver medal at 2005 Golden West Invitational in 200 meters and 2005 State of Colorado boys Track and field Gatorade Player of the Year awards.

NCAA
Dodson ran in 2008 United States Olympic Trials (track and field) in the 200 meters placing 17th. He placing 20th in 100 meters and 13th in the 200 meters at 2010 USA Outdoor Track and Field Championships.

Outdoor
Dodson is a four time NCAA Division I All-American. He earned four letters at Colorado. He stands fourth on the all-time Colorado Buffaloes list in the 100 metres in 10.27 and first on University of Colorado Boulder Outdoor record books in the 200 meters in 20.37.

Indoor
He stands third on Colorado Buffaloes Indoor record books in the 60 meters in 6.73. He stands first on University of Colorado Indoor record books in the 200 meters in 20.88.

World competition
Dodson is a bronze medalist for the United States at Athletics at the 2011 Pan American Games – Men's 4 × 100 metres relay. He competed in the 200 metres at the 2011 World Championships in Athletics – Men's 200 metres for the United States in Daegu, South Korea. He competed for Samoa in the 200 meters at the 2015 World Championships in Athletics in Beijing, China. Dodson qualified to represent Samoa at the 2016 Summer Olympics by meeting Athletics at the 2016 Summer Olympics – Qualification in 200 meters in Phoenix May 2016. Dodson placed 35th at 200 meters 20.51 s in Rio de Janeiro at Athletics at the 2016 Summer Olympics – Men's 200 metres opening round.

USA Outdoor Track and Field Championships

References

External links
 
 
 
 
 
 
 

1987 births
Living people
American sportspeople of Samoan descent
Track and field athletes from New York (state)
Track and field athletes from Denver
Samoan male sprinters
American male sprinters
World Athletics Championships athletes for Samoa
World Athletics Championships athletes for the United States
Pan American Games track and field athletes for the United States
Pan American Games medalists in athletics (track and field)
Pan American Games bronze medalists for the United States
Athletes (track and field) at the 2011 Pan American Games
Athletes (track and field) at the 2016 Summer Olympics
Olympic athletes of Samoa
Athletes (track and field) at the 2018 Commonwealth Games
Medalists at the 2011 Pan American Games
Commonwealth Games competitors for Samoa